Mike Taylor (born June 12, 1941) is an American hairdresser, rancher, and politician.

Born in Lewistown, Fergus County, Montana, Taylor grew up in Judith Basin County, Montana. He owned a hair cutting shop and was a rancher, living in Proctor, Montana. From 1997 to 2005, Taylor served in the Montana State Senate as a Republican. In 2002, Taylor ran for the United States Senate in Montana, opposing the incumbent Max Baucus. He then re-entered the campaign and lost the election to Baucus.

References

1941 births
Living people
People from Lewistown, Montana
People from Judith Basin County, Montana
American hairdressers
Ranchers from Montana
Republican Party Montana state senators
People from Lake County, Montana